Mark Andrew Brilakis (born November 27, 1958) is a retired lieutenant general in the United States Marine Corps, who served as the Commander of United States Marine Corps Forces Command.

Marine Corps career
Brilakis was commissioned through Platoon Leaders Class upon graduating from Franklin & Marshall College in 1981. He graduated from The Basic School at Marine Corps Base Quantico and served with 1st Battalion, 10th Marines as a Battery Officer. Company Officer and Commanding Officer, Company A, and Course Developer, MCI Company, Marine Barracks, Washington D.C. His staff assignments include Battalion S-3, 5th Battalion, 10th Marines; Naval Gunfire Control Officer and Assistant Supporting Arms Coordinator, Amphibious Group Two; student at Amphibious Warfare School; student at Marine Corps Command and Staff College; Future Operations and MAGTF Planner, G-3, II MEF; Executive Officer, 10th Marine Regiment; and Program Development Branch, Programs and Resources Department, HQMC.

As a lieutenant colonel Brilakis was assigned as Commanding Officer 1st Battalion, 10th Marines. He also served as Commanding Officer, Weapons Training Battalion, Training Command. Brilakis was selected for promotion to colonel in February 2002. Brilakis was selected for promotion to brigadier general in March 2007.

As a general officer, Brilakis served as Commanding General, 3rd Marine Expeditionary Brigade; Deputy Commanding General, III Marine Expeditionary Force; Commanding General, Marine Corps Recruiting Command; Director, European Liaison Office, United States European Command; Commanding General, 3rd Marine Division from April 2009 to June 2011; Assistant Deputy Commandant (Programs), Programs & Resources Department, Headquarters Marine Corps; Commander, U.S. Marine Corps Forces Command, Fleet Marine Forces Atlantic; and Deputy Commandant, Manpower and Reserve Affairs Department, Headquarters Marine Corps. He retired from active duty on July 12, 2019.

Awards and decorations

References

Living people
1958 births
People from Dayton, Ohio
Lieutenant generals
Franklin & Marshall College alumni
United States Marine Corps officers
United States Marine Corps personnel of the Gulf War
Recipients of the Legion of Merit
United States Marine Corps generals
Recipients of the Defense Superior Service Medal